Saint Vincent and the Grenadines competed at the 2022 World Aquatics Championships in Budapest, Hungary from 18 June to 3 July.

Swimming

Swimmers from Saint Vincent and the Grenadines have achieved qualifying standards in the following events.

References

Nations at the 2022 World Aquatics Championships
Saint Vincent and the Grenadines at the World Aquatics Championships
World Aquatics Championships